Paradevosia is a genus of bacteria from the family of Hyphomicrobiaceae with one known species (Paradevosia shaoguanensis).

References

Hyphomicrobiales
Monotypic bacteria genera
Bacteria genera